Damnation Alley is a 1969 science fiction novel by American writer Roger Zelazny, based on a novella published in 1967. A film adaptation of the novel was released in 1977.

Plot introduction

The story opens in a post-apocalyptic Southern California, in a hellish world shattered by nuclear war thirty years before.  Several police states have emerged in remaining areas of the former United States that can still support human life.  As a result of the war, hurricane-force winds above  prevent any sort of air travel from one state to the next.  Sudden, violent, and unpredictable "garbage storms," and giant, mutated animals make day-to-day life treacherous. 

Hell Tanner, an imprisoned Hells Angels member, is offered a full pardon for his crimes in exchange for taking on a suicide mission: a precarious drive through Damnation Alley, a narrow passage relatively free of lethal radiation, across a ruined America from Los Angeles to Boston, as part of a convoy of three Landmaster vehicles attempting to deliver an urgently needed plague vaccine to survivors.

Reception
Barry N. Malzberg found the book "an interesting novella converted to an unfortunate novel," faulting it as "a mechanical, simply transposed action-adventure story written, in my view, at the bottom of the man's talent."  Zelazny himself agreed with Malzberg, stating that he preferred the novella and only expanded it at his agent's request to make it more viable for a movie deal.

Film adaptation
In 1977, a film loosely based on the novel was directed by Jack Smight. Roger Zelazny liked the original script by Lukas Heller, which was more faithful to his book, and expected that to be the filmed version; he did not realize until he saw it in the theater that the shooting script (by Alan Sharp) was vastly different.

Related works
The novel Hardwired by Walter Jon Williams is an homage to Damnation Alley. The two authors (Zelazny and Williams) later became good friends.

Kevin O'Neill has said that the 2000AD story "The Cursed Earth" was inspired by Damnation Alley.

The Hawkwind album Quark, Strangeness and Charm contains a song inspired by the story.

The setting and premise of the 2011 Lonesome Road add-on for the post-apocalyptic computer game Fallout: New Vegas was inspired by Damnation Alley, according to lead designer Chris Avellone.  The film adaptation of Zelazny's novel was also one of several sources of inspiration for the original Fallout, according to designer R. Scott Campbell.

Notes

References

External links 
 
 "Damnation Alley" (novella) at the Internet Archive
 
 

1969 American novels
1969 science fiction novels
American post-apocalyptic novels
American science fiction novels
American novels adapted into films
G. P. Putnam's Sons books
Novels by Roger Zelazny